Rakan Rushaidat (born 25 October 1977) is a Croatian actor. He has starred in numerous commercially and critically acclaimed Croatian films, including Sex, Drink and Bloodshed (2003), The One Who Will Stay Unnoticed (2004), Metastases (2009), Vegetarian Cannibal (2012), A Stranger (2013) and Mali (2018).

Selected filmography

References

External links 

1977 births
Living people
Croatian people of Jordanian descent
Academy of Dramatic Art, University of Zagreb alumni
Croatian Theatre Award winners
Croatian male television actors
Croatian theatre directors
Croatian male voice actors
Male actors from Zagreb
Croatian male film actors
Croatian male stage actors